Thawville is a village in Ridgeland Township, Iroquois County, Illinois, United States. The population was 241 at the 2010 census.

Thawville is named after Pittsburgh railroad magnate William Thaw Sr., who visited the town only once.

Geography
Thawville is located in western Iroquois County at  (40.673903, -88.113296). Illinois Route 54 passes through the southeast side of the village, leading northeast  to Onarga and southwest the same distance to Roberts.

Demographics

As of the census of 2000, there were 258 people, 102 households, and 74 families residing in the village. The racial makeup of the village was 96.12% White, 0.39% Asian, 3.10% from other races, and 0.39% from two or more races. Hispanic or Latino of any race were 5.04% of the population.

There were 102 households, out of which 33.3% had children under the age of 18 living with them, 61.8% were married couples living together, 6.9% had a female householder with no husband present, and 26.5% were non-families. 24.5% of all households were made up of individuals, and 14.7% had someone living alone who was 65 years of age or older.  The average household size was 2.53 and the average family size was 2.96.

In the village, the population was spread out, with 26.0% under the age of 18, 5.4% from 18 to 24, 26.7% from 25 to 44, 22.5% from 45 to 64, and 19.4% who were 65 years of age or older.  The median age was 41 years. For every 100 females, there were 91.1 males.  For every 100 females age 18 and over, there were 89.1 males.

The median income for a household in the village was $39,659, and the median income for a family was $43,906. Males had a median income of $26,667 versus $17,222 for females. The per capita income for the village was $18,149.  About 4.2% of families and 2.6% of the population were below the poverty line, including none of those under the age of eighteen and 11.4% of those 65 or over.

References

Villages in Iroquois County, Illinois
Villages in Illinois